James Arthur Campbell (February 5, 1924 – October 31, 1995) was an American baseball executive in Major League Baseball.  He worked for the Detroit Tigers for 43 seasons from 1949 to 1992.  He was the team's general manager from September 1962 to September 1983, its president from August 1978 to January 1990, and its chairman from January 1990 to August 1992. The Tigers won two World Series championships (1968 and 1984) during Campbell's tenure with the club. He was selected as the Major League Baseball executive of the year in 1968 and was inducted into the Michigan Sports Hall of Fame in 1985.

Early years
Campbell was born in 1924 in Huron, Ohio, and played four sports at Huron High School. His father died after being injured in an electrical accident while Campbell was still in high school.  Campbell enrolled at Ohio State University in 1942 and played freshman football.  He served in the United States Navy Air Corps from 1943 to 1946 before returning to Ohio State. He played as an outfielder for the Ohio State Buckeyes baseball team for three years before graduating in 1949 with a bachelor's degree in commerce.

Detroit Tigers
Campbell joined the Tigers organization in 1949 as the business manager of the Class D (equivalent to Rookie-level today) Thomasville Tigers in Thomasville, Georgia. The stadium in Thomasville burned to the ground after the first game of Campbell's tenure. Campbell gained praise for keeping the team playing with borrowed uniforms and overseeing the prompt reconstruction of the stadium.

Campbell was promoted to business manager of the Tigers' farm system in 1952. In 1957, Campbell became the major-league team's business manager, and in 1959 he became a vice president. In September 1962, at age 38, he became the team's general manager. 

Notable moves and accomplishments during Campbell's tenure as the Tigers' general manager include the following:
 In April 1963, Campbell signed Denny McLain off waivers from the Chicago White Sox. McLain won 104 games for the Tigers from 1965 to 1969, including a 31-win season in 1968.
 Campbell assembled the 1968 Tigers team that won the 1968 World Series. In November 1968, Campbell was selected by The Sporting News as the Major League Baseball Executive of the Year following a poll of major league presidents and general managers. 
 In October 1970, Campbell negotiated an eight-player trade that sent Denny McLain to the Washington Senators in exchange for pitcher Joe Coleman, shortstop Eddie Brinkman and third baseman Aurelio Rodriguez. McLain and the other players sent to Washington fizzled, while Coleman won 62 games from 1971 to 1973 and Brinkman and Rodriguez anchored the left side of Detroit's infield for much of the 1970s.
 In 1971, Campbell hired Billy Martin as the Tigers' manager. Martin led an aging Detroit team to 91 wins in 1971 and to the American League East championship in 1972. Campbell then fired Martin in September 1973.
 In June 1978, Campbell selected Kirk Gibson with the Tigers' first round pick in the 1978 baseball draft. Gibson became a key player in the Detroit team that won the 1984 World Series.
 In June 1979, Campbell hired Sparky Anderson as the Tigers' manager. Campbell signed Anderson to a -year contract that was, at the time, "the longest, richest contract they have ever given any manager." Anderson remained the Tigers manager through the 1995 season and was selected as the AL Manager of the Year in 1984 and 1987.
 In June 1980, Campbell announced that he was closing the bleachers at Tiger Stadium due to rowdyism.  He said at the time: "I'm just goddamn fed up with them. I'm sick and tired. It's dangerous. It gives the city a bad name."

In August 1978, he was promoted to team president. However, he had been operating head of the franchise for some time before then. Owner John Fetzer had been nominal team president since 1961, but mostly left the team in Campbell's hands and rarely interfered.

In February 1982, Campbell underwent heart bypass surgery, and he was hospitalized briefly in August 1983 after experiencing dizziness.  In September 1983, and acting on his doctor's advice, Campbell stepped down as general manager, turning over that role to longtime assistant Bill Lajoie. However, he remained as the club's president.

In February 1985, Campbell was inducted into the Michigan Sports Hall of Fame. In January 1990, Campbell, at age 65, stepped down as the Tigers' president; former Michigan Wolverines football coach Bo Schembechler replaced him. (Schembechler had retired from Michigan weeks earlier.)  Campbell remained as chairman and chief executive officer and continued to maintain an office at Tiger Stadium. After owner Tom Monaghan agreed to sell the team to Mike Ilitch, Monaghan fired both Campbell and Schembechler in August 1992.

Family and later years
Campbell was married in 1954 to Helene Grace Mulligan of Lakewood, Ohio.  They were divorced in 1969. Campbell later blamed his devotion to the Tigers for the divorce.  He recalled in 1989: "I've worked for this club for 40 years, and I've had very few days off. I'm talking about weekends and everything."
After being fired in 1992, Campbell did not return to Tiger Stadium. In October 1995, he suffered a heart attack in Lakeland, Florida, and died at the Lakeland Regional Medical Center at age 71.

References

1924 births
1995 deaths
Detroit Tigers executives
Major League Baseball executives
Major League Baseball farm directors
Major League Baseball general managers
Major League Baseball team presidents
People from Erie County, Ohio